Antun Giuriceo (9 May 1778 – 25 March 1842) was a Croatian prelate of the Catholic Church who served as the bishop of Dubrovnik from 1830 to 1842 and the apostolic administrator of Trebinje-Mrkan from 1839 to 1842. He is best known for renewing the public festivity of Saint Blaise, the patron of Dubrovnik in 1836.

Biography 

Giuriceo was born in Krk. After finishing studies, he was ordained a priest in Trieste on 18 October 1801. Afterward, he lectured philosophy and served as a perfect at the episcopal seminary. From 1819 to 1827, Giuriceo lectured theology and served as a house chaplain and a secretary to the archbishop of Gorizia. From 1827 to 1830, he was an advisor for religious matters to the regional Dalmatian government.

Giuriceo was selected to become the bishop of Dubrovnik on 1 November 1829. Pope Pius VIII confirmed his appointment on 5 July 1830. He was consecrated at the cathedral in Gorizia on 21 November 1830 by the archbishop of Gorizia Joseph Walland. He was installed in Dubrovnik in 1831. Thus, he became the first bishop of Dubrovnik, after the archdiocese was relegated to the status of a diocese and ceased to be a metropolitan seat in 1828. Giuriceo had the task of establishing the church administration after a long period of sede vacante and adjusting the church's life to the new post-republican era.

Giuriceo resided in the Pile neighbourhood of Dubrovnik. He negotiated the transfer of the episcopal seat to the Sorkočević Palace, which at the time served as the municipal court. He is best known for renewing the public festivity of Saint Blaise, the patron of Dubrovnik in 1836, together with poet Antun Kazančić. The public celebrations were forbidden by the French and Austrian authorities.

Giuriceo also met with the Jesuits the first the order was re-established on 27 February 1841. Vincenzo Basile and his two associates met the bishop, who asked them to stay in Dubrovnik for pastoral work. However, the Jesuits couldn't stay in Dubrovnik and left the city on 24 March 1841. Giuriceo decided to invite the Jesuits to Dubrovnik, however, he died soon after.

On 30 September 1839, Pope Gregory XVI gave the apostolic administration over the Diocese of Treibnje Mrkan, located in the Ottoman Empire, to the bishops of Dubrovnik. On 20 June 1840, Giuriceo appointed Vidoje Maslać, a parish priest of Dubrave near Neum, his special vicar for Trebinje-Mrkan. He was unable to make an official visitation to the diocese.

He died at his residence in Pile, Dubrovnik and is buried in the crypt of the Jesuit Church of St. Ignatius.

Footnotes

References

Books

Journals

Websites 

 
 

1778 births
1842 deaths
Bishops of Dubrovnik
Apostolic Administrators of Trebinje-Mrkan
Bishops appointed by Pope Pius VIII
19th-century Roman Catholic bishops in Croatia
19th-century Roman Catholic bishops in Bosnia and Herzegovina